Gun Battle at Monterey is a 1957 American Western film directed by Carl K. Hittleman and Sidney Franklin and starring Sterling Hayden.

Plot
After he and his partner, Reno (Ted de Corsia), hold up a bank, Turner (Sterling Hayden) decides he wants to branch out on his own. When he tells Reno, Reno shoots him and makes off with the money. But Turner doesn't die — rather, he is discovered and mended by a beautiful Mexican woman named Maria (Pamela Duncan). After he is fully recovered, Turner sets off to exact his revenge on Reno, vowing never to rest until Reno is dead and he's recovered his share of the loot.

Cast
 Sterling Hayden as Jay Turner / John York
 Pamela Duncan as Maria Salvador
 Ted de Corsia as Max Reno
 Mary Beth Hughes as Cleo 
 Lee Van Cleef as Kirby
 Charles Cane as Sheriff Claude Mundy
 Pat Comiskey as Frank
 Byron Foulger as Carson
 Mauritz Hugo as Charley
 I. Stanford Jolley as Idwall

See also
 List of American films of 1957

References

External links
 
 
 

1957 films
1957 Western (genre) films
American Western (genre) films
Allied Artists films
1950s English-language films
Films directed by Sidney Franklin
1950s American films